The ceremony for the 6th Shorty Awards took place on April 7, 2014, at the New York Times Center and was hosted by comedian Natasha Leggero. The show included appearances by Patton Oswalt, Jamie Oliver, Kristen Bell, Jerry Seinfeld, Moshe Kasher, Julie Klausner, Erin Brady, Guy Kawasaki, Matt Walsh, Retta, Us the Duo, Big Boi, Gilbert Gottfried, Thomas Middleditch, Billie Jean King and Leandra Medine. Winners included Jerry Seinfeld and Will Ferrell.



Influencer Winners by category

Brand & Organization Winners by category

References 

Shorty Awards
Shorty
2014 in Internet culture